Hongfu Temple is a Buddhist temple located on Mount Qianling, in Yunyan District of Guiyang, Guizhou, China. Hongfu Temple and Qixia Temple are collectively known as the "Two Attractions in Guiyang".

Name
"Hongfu" in Chinese literally means developing Buddha's spirit and benefiting the mankind.

History
The temple was originally built in 1672, eleventh year of the Kangxi Emperor, by monk Chisong, under the Qing dynasty (1644–1911). After the passing away of Chisong, his disciple Zhai Mai succeeded as the abbot. In 1739, in the 4th year of Qianlong period, the Qing government bestowed a set of Chinese Buddhist canon on the temple.

In 1929, Buddhist monk Guoyao founded the "Guizhou Buddhist College" in the temple.

After the founding PRC, Master Huaiyi served as abbot of Hongfu Temple. During the ten-year devastating Cultural Revolution, the temple was dilapidated with huge losses of the cultural relics and encountered massive destruction.

After the 3rd Plenary Session of the 11th Central Committee of the Chinese Communist Party in 1983, Hongfu Temple was designated as a National Key Buddhist Temple in Han Chinese Area by the State Council of China.

On July 28, 1987, the government transferred the management rights to the temple.

Architecture
Now the existing main buildings include the Shanmen, Four Heavenly Kings Hall, Mahavira Hall, Hall of Guanyin, Hall of Maitreya, Buddhist Texts Library, and Pilu Pavilion.

Shanmen
Under the eaves of the Shanmen is a plaque with the Chinese characters "Hongfu Temple" written by the former president of the Buddhist Association of China Zhao Puchu. A pair of Chinese guardian lions stands on both sides of the Shanmen.

Bell tower
A biggest copper bell is stored in the Bell tower. The  copper bell was cast in 1469 during the mid-Ming dynasty (1368–1644).

Four Heavenly Kings Hall
Maitreya is enshrined in the Hall of Heavenly Kings. Four Heavenly Kings' statues are enshrined in the left and right side of the hall.

Hall of Guanyin
The statue of 32 Armed Guanyin is enshrined in the Hall of Guanyin, 32 arms represent 32 incarnation of Guanyin. At the back of Guanyin is a statue of Skanda.

Mahavira Hall
The Mahavira Hall enshrining the Three Saints of Hua-yan. In the middle is Sakyamuni, statues of Manjushri and Samantabhadra stand on the left and right sides of Sakyamuni's statue. In front of Sakyamuni stand Ananda and Kassapa Buddha on the left and right. The statues of Eighteen Arhats stand on both sides of the hall.

Jade Buddha Hall
The statue came from Yangon, Myanmar.

References

Buddhist temples in Guizhou
Buildings and structures in Guiyang
Tourist attractions in Guiyang
17th-century establishments in China
17th-century Buddhist temples
Religious buildings and structures completed in 1672
Linji school temples